Hedd Wyn is a 1992 Welsh anti-war biopic, written by Alan Llwyd and directed by Paul Turner.

Based on the life of Ellis Humphrey Evans (Huw Garmon), killed in the First World War, the cinematography starkly contrasts the lyrical beauty of the poet's native Meirionnydd with the bombed-out horrors of Passchendaele. The protagonist is depicted as a tragic hero with an intense dislike of the pro-war jingoism which surrounds him. The film's title is Ellis Evans' bardic name ("blessed peace"), under which he was posthumously awarded the Chair at the 1917 National Eisteddfod of Wales.

Hedd Wyn won the Royal Television Society's Award for Best Single Drama and BAFTA Cymru Awards in several categories; and was the first Welsh language film nominated for an Academy Award.

Plot
As the camera pans over the intricate carving on the infamous "Black Chair", the voice of the Archdruid Dyfed is heard vainly summoning the poet who signs his work with the nom de plume "Fleur-de-lis" to stand and be chaired. The film then flashes back to 1913.

As a farmer's son in the village of Trawsfynydd, Ellis Humphrey Evans composes poetry for local eisteddfodau under the bardic name Hedd Wyn ("Blessed Peace"). A friend and student minister, William Morris (Arwel Gruffydd), advises Ellis that his verse possesses a passion which better educated poets lack. Therefore, with more work and less womanizing, Ellis could win the National Eisteddfod. Ellis smiles and quips, "Where do you think all that passion comes from?"  Meanwhile, international tensions rise and the British Army installs an artillery range on a local hillside, much to Ellis' annoyance.

In August 1914, Britain declares war on Germany. Soon afterwards, at a gathering in the village street, an Anglican minister gives a rousing sermon which demands immediate enlistment in the armed forces. Disgusted, William Morris calls the Anglican minister "a disgrace to his calling", and tells those nearby not to be deceived. In spite of this, several young men from Trawsfynydd join the British Army, including Ellis' friend Griff Jones (Gruffudd Aled).

Despite mounting pressure, Ellis refuses to enlist and says that he does not think he can kill anyone. As a result, Ellis' fiancée, Lizzie Roberts (Sue Roderick), accuses him of being "afraid of becoming a man". At a fair, Ellis attempts to mend his relationship with Lizzie, only to find that she has formed a romantic relationship with an English soldier, informing Ellis that "It's nothing personal... I just don't like your clothes." Later, in the village pub, Ellis and Moi Davies (Emlyn Gomer) are giving Griff, who is now in uniform, a send-off. As fellow villagers sing the recruiting song "Your King and Country Want You" in their honour, Lizzie appears in the pub's doorway. Ellis spots her and begins to loudly sing "Myfanwy", a song with implications of female betrayal. Sensing Lizzie's distress, her new beau punches Ellis in the face, yelling "You're upsetting the lady! Welsh bastard!"

On a train, Ellis encounters Jini Owen (Judith Humphreys), a young woman who admires his poetry. Noticing her interest in him, Ellis asks for Jini's address and sends her a letter. Soon the two are deeply in love. Simultaneously, Ellis develops a close friendship with Mary Catherine Hughes (Nia Dryhurst), the young woman who is his sister's teacher. He explains to her that, whenever a poem is lacking, he will cast it into the river, and that it will always return to him stronger. On a railway journey with Jini, Ellis encounters two hideously disfigured war veterans. Despite his sympathy for their plight, the soldiers accuse Ellis of cowardice for remaining a civilian. As he and Jini depart, one of the soldiers threatens to mail him a white feather. Ellis quips, "You don't have any wings, let alone feathers."

Ultimately, Lizzie returns to the village with tuberculosis. After a church service, she informs Ellis that he was right about the war, which is a curse. Later, as Lizzie lies dying, Ellis visits her sickbed and promises to bring her to the National Eisteddfod. Soon afterwards, an official of the draft board arrives at the family farm and takes down the names of Ellis and his brother Bob (Ceri Cunnington), despite the resistance of Ellis' mother (Llio Silyn). As a result, the Crown informs the Evans family that one of their sons must enlist in the British Army.

Although 17-year-old Bob longs to enlist instead, Ellis refuses to permit this. Horrified of losing him, Jini pleads with Ellis to let Bob enlist in his place. Enraged, Ellis says that, if Bob were injured or killed, he could never live with himself. With Jini seeing him off, Ellis departs by train to join the Royal Welch Fusiliers in Liverpool. Despite the insults showered on them by their English-speaking drill sergeant, Ellis and his fellow Fusiliers continue their training in good spirits and are sent to France. Facing what may be his last chance to win the Eisteddfod, Ellis pleads with his platoon commander to send his awdl Yr Arwr (The Hero) via the Army Postal Service. The young officer, who is unable to read Welsh, at first refuses, suspecting the poem to be a coded message to the Germans.  Eventually he relents, mails Ellis' submission, and praises him as "The Armageddon Poet".

On 31 July 1917, the Fusiliers go over the top and into the Battle of Passchendaele. Crawling through swampy shell holes filled with corpses, Ellis witnesses his fellow soldiers being shot and blown to pieces around him. At last, he is wounded by shrapnel and crumples to the ground. After hours of lying in no man's land, Ellis is evacuated to an aid post, where he succumbs to his injuries. His parents are devastated when they receive a telegram informing them of Ellis' death. Jini weeps inconsolably as she reads Ellis' last letter, in which her beloved proposed marriage in a poem. Mary Catherine, in a last tribute to her friend, casts the manuscript of Ellis' poem Rhyfel (War) into the river.

The Evans family receives another telegram which announces that Ellis' submission has won the National Eisteddfod. To the sound of R. Williams Parry's Englynion coffa Hedd Wyn (Englynion in memory of Hedd Wyn), the chair which Ellis has dreamed of all his life is delivered to his parents' farmhouse, robed in black.

Commentary
Hedd Wyn has been cited by Kate Woodward of Aberystwyth University as one of "a number of films produced for S4C which ... scrutinized the trinity of dynamic tensions that existed between Wales, England and 'Britain'". It is described as "expressing the feelings of Welsh men who are fighting the British cause in wartime, despite their being at odds with aspects of the conflict and the priorities of a Westminster government....In the film, the war-mongering attitude is synonymous with England and Englishness, and the Welsh and English languages are persistently juxtaposed....[T]he Welsh language is a site of struggle, but by exploring its difference with the English language, it is also a means of defining and strengthening one’s identity".

Awards
Hedd Wyn was the first Welsh film to be nominated for Best Foreign Language Film, in 1993, at the U.S.-based Academy of Motion Picture Arts and Sciences Academy Awards. Its nomination as a film from the United Kingdom - as opposed to Wales - caused controversy. Hedd Wyn's awards include the Royal Television Society's Award for Best Single Drama (1992), Celtic Film Festival's Spirit of the Festival Award (1993), First Prize at the Belgium Film Festival (1994) and a section award at the Karlovy Vary International Film Festival (1994).

See also
 List of British submissions for the Academy Award for Best Foreign Language Film
 List of submissions to the 66th Academy Awards for Best Foreign Language Film

References

External links

Hedd Wyn – The Armageddon Poet

Anti-English sentiment
Anti-war films about World War I
1990s war drama films
War epic films
Films set in the 1910s
1990s biographical drama films
Cool Cymru
Films shot in Wales
Films set in Wales
Western Front (World War I) films
World War I films based on actual events
Welsh-language films
Welsh films
1992 films
Biographical films about poets
1992 drama films